Aydınlar or Aydinlar may refer to:

People
 Mehmet Ali Aydınlar, Turkish businessman

Places
 Tillo or Aydınlar, a district in Siirt Province, Turkey
 Aydınlar, Adıyaman, a village in the Adıyaman district of Adıyaman Province, Turkey
 Aydınlar, Bartın, a village in the Bartın district of Bartın Province, Turkey
 Aydınlar, Erdemli, a village in the Erdemli district of Mersin Province, Turkey
 Aydınlar, Elâzığ, a village in the Elazığ District of Elazığ Province, Turkey
 Aydınlar, Gerede, a village in the Gerede district of Bolu Province, Turkey
 Aydınlar, Honaz, a village in the Honaz district of Denizli Province, Turkey
 Aydinlar, Azerbaijan, a village in the Davachi Rayon, Azerbaijan

Turkish-language surnames